Galeophobia is the medical term for a fear of [sharks]. The name galeophobia derives from the Greek language with galeos meaning shark and phobia meaning fear.  This phobia is diagnosed using DSM-5 criteria and is characterized by a patient showing marked fear or anxiety about sharks that leads to severe impairment of their quality of life. Patients must experience these feelings for at least six months. In some cases, galeophobia is so strong that the word "shark", or a video or picture can cause significant discomfort or feelings of panic. Although it is not known exactly how many people have been diagnosed with galeophobia, a study conducted in 2015 revealed that just over half (51%) of Americans are absolutely terrified of sharks.

Causes 
The fear of sharks, while perpetrated by the media in recent decades, has been around for all of humanity. Galeophobia is a primal instinct. The fear of sharks stems from humans' attempt to avoid sharks, which was essential to our survival as a species over hundreds of thousands of years. The physical aspects of sharks, particularly the Great White Shark, have been noted as strong reasons why people fear these animals. Individuals with galeophobia typically see sharks as a threat to their life. The rows of sharp teeth and huge jaws have been reported as 'diabolical', 'gruesome' and 'terrifying' by those who suffer from the phobia. Another aspect of the fear stems from territorial 'violations' by sharks. Sharks are said to encroach and intrude on areas where humans visit, including beaches and fishing waters. 

Despite the statistically low risk of shark attacks, the possibility of human-shark interactions contributes to galeophobia. In 2018, PETA released a study that revealed humans killed approximately 100 million sharks worldwide during 2018, whereas sharks killed a total of just five humans in that same year.  While the phobia may not be statistically rational, humans are wired to fear any animal that poses a threat, setting off a fight or flight reaction.

Human-Shark Interactions 
Popular media has historically portrayed sharks as a significant threat to humans, but many marine biologists and animal rights activists argue that sharks are misunderstood as a species. 

Occasionally referred to as “living fossils”, there is fossil evidence for the existence of sharks that dates back to 450 million years ago, during the Late Ordovician Period. Throughout their evolution, sharks have undergone periods of diversification and there are now more than 500 species of sharks in the ocean.  Sharks’ diets vary depending on the size and habitat of the particular species. The most common prey across shark species are fish, but larger sharks are known to also prey on semi-aquatic marine animals, such as seals and sea lions. Despite their reputation as a “man-eating” species, scientific literature suggests that humans are not typical prey for sharks. 

Research on the behaviour of sharks during interactions with humans suggests that most shark attacks, even those that are fatal, stem from the shark’s curiosity or confusion. Sharks may bite surfers or swimmers in an attempt to identify a foreign object in their environment. 

Humans pose a comparatively greater risk to sharks than sharks do to humans.  One attempt to mitigate the risk of shark attacks is shark culling: the government-enforced hunting and killing of sharks.  The negative reputation of sharks may contribute to the appeal of shark culling.  Marine conservationists argue that shark culling is a misinformed and ineffective mitigation technique. Presently, there is no evidence to suggest that the practice of shark culling reduces the rates of shark attacks.

See also 
 Fear of fish

References 

Phobias